Manchi Chedu is a 1964 Indian Telugu-language drama film, produced and directed by T. R. Ramanna. It stars N. T. Rama Rao and B. Saroja Devi, with music jointly composed by Viswanathan–Ramamoorthy. The film was a remake of Tamil film Paasam.

Plot
The film begins with a couple, Kutumba Rao and Sarada who are perturbed without children. Kutumba Rao's cousin asks him to remarry her daughter Pankajam. Sarada agrees to his espousal and quits the house. Meanwhile, Kutumba Rao reaches their village to meet his brother who is on his deathbed. He keeps his property in the name of his son Madhu and entrusts his responsibility to Kutumba Rao, but he forbids the kid by squatting his wealth. Destiny makes Sarada spot and rears him as unbeknownst. Simultaneously, she conceives and returns home. However, she remains back witnessing Kutumba Rao wed locking Pankaja. After that Sarada gives birth to a boy, and the two children Madhu and Gopi start to grow. When Gopi hears from his mother about their father, he becomes enraged and when he hears of a person getting remarried, throws a stone at him and the person dead. Gopi was sent to Borstal School.

After ten years, Gopi comes out of jail and joins a gang, and Madhu becomes VDO at Kondagunta. Kutumba Rao with the help of goon Kaali is doing crimes in the village, Chandra, the sister of Kaali loves Madhu. Manju a dancer performs a program in the village for fundraising while going back she was obstructed by goons, Gopi rescues her, and both of them fall in love. Meanwhile, Madhu takes back all the fields occupied by Kutumba Rao so, he sends Kaali to kill Madhu, in the last-minute Kaali discovers that his sister is in love with Madhu, so, he changes his decision and joins with Madhu. Meanwhile, Manju's mother knows that her daughter loves a thief, so, she requests Gopi to step down from Manju's life, he agrees to it, then Manju goes into a depression and becomes sicker day by day. Kutumba Rao learns that Kaali and Madhu became friends, so, he uses Gopi to trap Madhu in a false allegation and Madhu is arrested.

But Gopi, by heart good in nature, realises Madhu's innocence and decides to protect him, and learns that Madhu is his brother and Sarada is his mother. Gopi meets Sarada and says Kutumba Rao is responsible for this and he does not have any right to live. At the same Manju's mother also understands Gopi's honesty and her daughter's love is true so, she gives money for Madhu's release and makes their marriage arrangements at night. After releasing Madhu, Gopi starts to Kutumba Rao's home, Sarada also follows him where she meets her husband, Kutumba Rao bursts out for his mistakes and apologizes to Sarada. In the process of eliminating Kutumba Rao, Gopi could not reach the wedding on time, desperate Manju takes poison, and everybody reaches there. Before dying, Gopi ties the wedding chain to Manju when he is about to kill Kutumba Rao, Gopi discovers that Kutumba Rao is his father. Finally, Gopi also follows Manju showing that they are immortal.

Cast
N. T. Rama Rao
B. Saroja Devi
Nagabhushanam
Padmanabham
Ramana Murthy
T. R. Rajakumari
Pushpavalli
Chaya Devi
Allu Rama Lingayya

Soundtrack 
Music composed by Viswanathan–Ramamoorthy. Lyrics were written by Acharya Aatreya.

References

External links 

 

Indian drama films
Films directed by T. R. Ramanna
Films scored by Viswanathan–Ramamoorthy
Telugu remakes of Tamil films